Klas Horn was originally the  torpedo gunboat Posadnik of the Imperial Russian Navy. One of three built for the Russian Baltic Fleet, Posednik was used as a despatch vessel during World War I. During the Russian Revolution, Finland declared independence from the Russian Empire and the ship, which lay abandoned in Finnish waters, was taken over by the newly formed Finnish Navy and renamed Klas Horn, after a 16th-century admiral. Klas Horn ended her Finnish Navy service in the 1930s. The ship was broken up for scrap in 1938.

Design and description
The  were an early Russian design of torpedo gunboats. The Kazarskis sported a single funnel. They were initially armed with six 3-pounder (47 mm) guns and three 1-pounder guns. The Kazarskis were also equipped with two  torpedo tubes. One was fixed in the bow while the other was deck-mounted and could be trained at targets.

The vessel underwent a series of modifications during her existence. In 1907 Posadnik had her 3-pounder guns replaced with two /40 calibre guns. In 1910 the ship was rearmed with two  guns, two 57 mm guns, two machine guns and the bow torpedo tube was removed. In 1911, Posadnik underwent another change, having the bow 75 mm gun swapped out for a /60 calibre gun. In 1917, the second 75 mm gun was swapped out for a 4-inch gun.

Construction and career
Posadnik was constructed at the Schichau shipyard in Elbing, Germany. The vessel was laid down in 1891 and launched on 13 April 1892. During World War I, Posadnik was used as a despatch vessel for the Baltic Fleet. During the Bolshevik Revolution, Finland declared independence from the Russian Empire in 1918. The basis for the new nation's navy were a series of former Russian vessels abandoned during the revolution in Finnish waters. Posadnik was taken over in March 1918 and renamed Klas Horn for a a 16th-century admiral. The ship was stricken in 1937 and broken up for scrap in 1938.

See also

Notes

Citations

References

 
 
 

1892 ships
Gunboats of the Imperial Russian Navy
Patrol vessels of the Finnish Navy
World War I ships of Russia